Svetlogorsk is the name of several inhabited localities in Russia.

Urban localities
Svetlogorsk, Kaliningrad Oblast, a town in Svetlogorsky District of Kaliningrad Oblast

Rural localities
Svetlogorsk, Chelyabinsk Oblast, a settlement in Svetlogorsky Selsoviet of Agapovsky District in Chelyabinsk Oblast
, a settlement in Svetlogorsky Selsoviet of Turukhansky District in Krasnoyarsk Krai
Svetlogorsk, Nizhny Novgorod Oblast, a settlement in Svetlogorsky Selsoviet of Shatkovsky District in Nizhny Novgorod Oblast